"What Drives the Weak" is the second single by Shadows Fall from their album The War Within. The song peaked at no. 38 on the Hot Mainstream Rock Tracks chart.

The song was nominated for a Grammy Award for Best Metal Performance at the 48th Annual Grammy Awards, but lost to "Before I Forget" by Slipknot.

Music video
The song's music video was directed by Zach Merck.

The video shows the band performing the song in a house inhabited by bikers. The video is inter-cut with shots of vocalist Brian Fair wandering around the house and encountering weird happenings while the other members interact with the bikers.

Track listing

Personnel
 Brian Fair – lead vocals
 Johnathan Donais – lead guitar, backing vocals
 Matt Bachand – rhythm guitar, backing vocals
 Paul Romanko – bass guitar
 Jason Bittner – drums

References

2005 singles
Shadows Fall songs
Century Media Records singles
2004 songs